Margonia is a genus of spiders in the family Lycosidae. It was first described in 1983 by Hippa & Lehtinen. , it contains only one species, Margonia himalayensis, found in India.

References

Lycosidae
Monotypic Araneomorphae genera
Spiders of the Indian subcontinent
Taxa named by Pekka T. Lehtinen